Squadron Leader John Stewart Hart   (11 September 1916 – 18 June 2019) was a Canadian pilot in the Royal Air Force (RAF) from 1938 to 1946.  He flew Lysanders in the RAF Army Cooperation Command, Spitfires in the Battle of Britain, Hurricanes in Burma and Mustangs in Italy.

Awards
Distinguished Flying Cross (London Gazette on 15 June 1945)

Reference

 1916 births
 2019 deaths
 Canadian World War II pilots
 Mount Allison University alumni
 People from Sackville, New Brunswick
 Recipients of the Distinguished Flying Cross (United Kingdom)
 Royal Air Force officers
 The Few
Men centenarians
Canadian centenarians
Canadian military personnel from New Brunswick